Hugh McCann (born 6 May 1954) is a Scottish former football player and manager. McCann signed for Celtic aged 14, but a bad knee injury halted his progress there. He later played for Linlithgow Rose, Alloa Athletic, Berwick Rangers and East Stirlingshire. He then managed Alloa Athletic, Queen's Park and East Stirlingshire. He has run the youth development systems of Alloa Athletic and Raith Rovers. McCann has also worked in coaching roles for Hearts, Aberdeen, Kilmarnock and Dundee.

References

Sources
 

1954 births
Living people
People from Linlithgow
Footballers from West Lothian
Scottish footballers
Association football defenders
Linlithgow Rose F.C. players
Alloa Athletic F.C. players
Berwick Rangers F.C. players
East Stirlingshire F.C. players
Scottish Football League players
Scottish football managers
Alloa Athletic F.C. managers
Queen's Park F.C. managers
East Stirlingshire F.C. managers
Heart of Midlothian F.C. non-playing staff
Aberdeen F.C. non-playing staff
Kilmarnock F.C. non-playing staff
Dundee F.C. non-playing staff
Celtic F.C. players
Scottish Football League managers